Kathleen Phillips is a Canadian actress based in Toronto, Ontario. She is most noted for her roles in the sketch comedy series Sunnyside, for which she and the other core cast collectively won the Canadian Screen Award for Best Performance in a Variety or Sketch Comedy Program or Series at the 4th Canadian Screen Awards in 2016, and Mr. D, for which she was a Canadian Screen Award nominee for Best Supporting Actress in a Comedy Series at the 5th Canadian Screen Awards in 2017.

A native of Keswick, Ontario, she is a graduate of Ryerson University's theatre school. She has also performed in the sketch comedy web series Terrific Women, and on stage with The Sketchersons and Laugh Sabbath. She has also created a number of one-woman character comedy shows, including Kathleen Phillips Is Besides Herself.

She is married to comedian Chris Locke.

References

External links

21st-century Canadian comedians
21st-century Canadian actresses
21st-century Canadian women writers
Canadian television actresses
Canadian film actresses
Canadian stage actresses
Canadian sketch comedians
Canadian television writers
Canadian comedy writers
Actresses from Toronto
Comedians from Toronto
Writers from Toronto
People from Georgina, Ontario
Toronto Metropolitan University alumni
Living people
Year of birth missing (living people)
Canadian women television writers